Ivan Jovanović (born 22 May 1991) is a Croatian footballer who plays as a forward for NK SOŠK Svirče.

Club career
On 21 January 2019 he re-joined Bisceglie. After spells at Dugopolje and NK Uskok Klis back in Croatia, Jovanović moved to Austrian club SVH Waldbach in the summer 2020. Due to the COVID-19 pandemic, he never played an official game for the club.

In March 2021, Jovanović joined NK SOŠK Svirče.

References

External links
PrvaLiga profile 

1991 births
Living people
Footballers from Split, Croatia
Association football forwards
Croatian footballers
HNK Hajduk Split players
NK Mosor players
NK Primorac 1929 players
Motor Lublin players
NK Celje players
NK Zadar players
FK Slavija Sarajevo players
KF Tërbuni Pukë players
Legionovia Legionowo players
RNK Split players
A.S. Bisceglie Calcio 1913 players
S.S.D. Lucchese 1905 players
NK Dugopolje players
NK Uskok players
Croatian Football League players
First Football League (Croatia) players
II liga players
Slovenian PrvaLiga players
Premier League of Bosnia and Herzegovina players
Kategoria Superiore players
Serie C players
Croatian expatriate footballers
Croatian expatriate sportspeople in Poland
Croatian expatriate sportspeople in Slovenia
Croatian expatriate sportspeople in Bosnia and Herzegovina
Croatian expatriate sportspeople in Albania
Croatian expatriate sportspeople in Italy
Croatian expatriate sportspeople in Austria
Expatriate footballers in Poland
Expatriate footballers in Slovenia
Expatriate footballers in Bosnia and Herzegovina
Expatriate footballers in Albania
Expatriate footballers in Italy
Expatriate footballers in Austria